"Keen on Disco" is the second single by the Danish dance/house duo Infernal from From Paris to Berlin, their most successful album to date. The single was released in June 2005 in a few selected European countries. It became a hit in Sweden and Finland, entering in the top 15 of both countries. The song became their biggest hit in Sweden, although "From Paris to Berlin" is their best-selling single ever. It managed to peak at number 12 in Finland in June 2005, and at number 13 in Sweden in August 2005.

Track listings
CD single 
"Keen on Disco" (Radio Edit) — 3:51
"Keen on Disco" (Extended Version) — 5:40

CD - Maxi 
"Keen on Disco" (Radio Edit) — 3:53
"Keen on Disco" (Extended Version) — 5:41
"Keen on Disco" (Hit 'n' Run 12" Disco Mix) — 5:29
"Keen on Disco" (Mouskouri Mix) — 4:04
"Keen on Disco" (Inf: Club Mix) — 6:28

Promo CD - Maxi 
"Keen on Disco" (Radio Edit) — 3:51
"Keen on Disco" (Extended Version) — 5:39
"Keen on Disco" (Hit 'n' Run 12" Disco Mix) — 5:27
"Keen on Disco" (Late Night Mix) — 4:47
"Keen on Disco" (Mouskouri Mix) — 4:02
"Keen on Disco" (Inf: Club Mix) — 6:27
"Keen on Disco" (Monday Morning Trance Mix) — 8:36
"Keen on Disco" (Inzider Mix) — 5:35
"Keen on Disco" (Rass & Miguel Electro Dub) — 5:34

Charts

Cover versions
The song was covered by Taiwanese pop singer Jolin Tsai under the title "Bravo Lover" for the 2007 album Agent J.

References

Infernal (Danish band) songs
2005 singles
Songs written by Adam Powers
Songs written by Lina Rafn
2005 songs
Songs written by Paw Lagermann
Songs about disco